John Morton Eshleman (June 14, 1876 – February 28, 1916) was an American lawyer and politician from California. He was Lieutenant Governor of California from 1915 to 1916.

A native of the Midwest, Eshleman was born in Villa Ridge, Illinois, but went west in 1896 to work on the Southern Pacific Railroad. Eshleman received his Bachelor of Arts from the University of California, Berkeley in 1902, and the next year he received his Master of Arts there. At Berkeley, he was president of the student government. Eshleman was admitted to the California Bar in 1905 and was appointed Deputy State Labor Commissioner by Governor George Pardee.

Eshleman ran for the state legislature on a Republican and Union-Labor ticket and was elected to the 38th California Assembly from the 52d District (Berkeley) in 1907. Though appointed Deputy District Attorney of Alameda County, he did not serve, moving instead to the Imperial Valley in Southern California for the dry air because of his poor health. When Imperial County was created from the eastern part of San Diego County in August 1907, Eshleman was chosen to be the first District Attorney of the county, serving from 1907 to 1910.

In 1910, Eshleman was elected to the third district seat on the California Railroad Commission with the backing of the progressive Lincoln-Roosevelt League. He was subsequently elected chair of the commission upon taking office in 1911. Eshleman was elected Lieutenant Governor as a Progressive in 1914. He was inaugurated January 5, 1915 and served under Governor Hiram Johnson until Eshleman's death in 1916. He died of a long battle with tuberculosis in Indio, California, and was buried in Inglewood Cemetery. His body was subsequently moved to the Sunset View Cemetery at El Cerrito in 1956. Johnson appointed William Stephens to replace Eshleman as lieutenant governor. Eshleman also served as an ex officio regent of the University of California by virtue of his office as lieutenant governor.

The student union at UC Berkeley was named Eshleman Hall in his honor; this building was later renamed Moses Hall. A new building (1965) called Eshleman Hall was subsequently erected, which housed various student groups including the campus newspaper, The Daily Californian. Eshleman Hall was demolished in the summer of 2013 and rebuilt in 2015.

Eshleman married Elizabeth Ledgett in 1906. His son, also named John Morton "Jack", was a newspaper reporter and wrote detective novels set in the Bay Area. Jack was an activist for labor rights and, during World War II, helped bring about the demise of "auxiliary" (segregated) unions in the Kaiser shipyards.  His daughter, Jane Eshleman Conant, was a pioneering woman writer for San Francisco newspapers from 1941 to 1976. Eshleman also had two other children, Kathryn Eshleman Wahl, a women's editor at the Oakland Tribune, and Robert T. Eshleman, a prominent Bay Area attorney. His daughters were the first two women's editors at The Daily Californian, which was housed in the original building named for their father.

References

External links

Join California John M. Eshleman

1876 births
1916 deaths
Lieutenant Governors of California
Republican Party members of the California State Assembly
University of California, Berkeley alumni
Politicians from Berkeley, California
People from Pulaski County, Illinois
20th-century deaths from tuberculosis
Tuberculosis deaths in California
California Progressives (1912)
District attorneys in California
Lawyers from Berkeley, California
19th-century American politicians